Massa Lubrense is a comune (municipality) in the Metropolitan City of Naples in the Italian region Campania, located about  southeast of Naples. As of 31 December 2004, it had a population of 13,404 and an area of 19.7 km2.

Geography
The municipality of Massa Lubrense contains the frazioni (subdivisions, mainly villages and hamlets) of Acquara, Annunziata, Casa, Marciano, Marina del Cantone, Marina della Lobra, Marina di Puolo, Metrano, Monticchio, Nerano, Pastena, San Francesco, Sant'Agata sui Due Golfi (location of the fjord Crapolla), Santa Maria della Neve, Schiazzano, Termini and Torca.

Massa Lubrense borders only with the municipality of Sorrento.

Demographic evolution

Gallery

See also
Sorrentine Peninsula
Amalfi Coast

References

External links

Comune di Massa Lubrense (Na)
Massa Lubrense web site

Coastal towns in Campania
Cities and towns in Campania